De Backer may refer to:

Augustin de Backer (1809–1873), Belgian Jesuit and bibliographer
Jacob de Backer (1555–1585), Flemish Mannerist painter and draughtsman active in Antwerp
Gotye  (born Wouter De Backer in 1980), Australian songwriter

Surnames of Belgian origin
Dutch-language surnames